The 1983 European Athletics Junior Championships was the seventh edition of the biennial athletics competition for European athletes aged under twenty. It was held in Schwechat, Austria between 25 and 28 August.

Men's results

Women's results

Medal table

References

Results
European Junior Championships 1983. World Junior Athletics History. Retrieved on 2013-05-27.

European Athletics U20 Championships
International athletics competitions hosted by Austria
European Junior
Schwechat
1983 in Austrian sport
1983 in youth sport